New York State Route 20A may refer to:

New York State Route 20A (1930–1932) in Chautauqua County
New York State Route 20A (1938–1939) in Livingston County
U.S. Route 20A (New York), the only route numbered 20A in New York since the late 1930s